The Utah Freezz were a professional American indoor soccer team based in Salt Lake City, Utah. The Freezz were a 1999 expansion team of the now-defunct World Indoor Soccer League. The team played in the E Center in West Valley City, Utah. Tim Mouser served as team president during its first two seasons and Chris Connolly was team president for the final season.

Featuring a mix of local and professional talent under head coach Dave Poggi, the Freezz finished the 1999 season with a 12–10 record. Utah soccer fans embraced its newest sports franchise, helping the Freezz finished second in attendance with an average of 6,726 fans for thirteen home games. Freezz players Brian Alba, Beau Brown, and Justin Labrum received league recognition in 1999: Brown was named to the All-WISL Second Team while Brighton High School star Justin Labrum was named the 1999 WISL Rookie of the Year.

The team continued play until the WISL ended in 2001. During the Freezz's three years in the WISL, their average attendance was 5,748 per game.

Year-by-year

Honors
Rookie of the Year 1999 — Justin Labrum
Coach of the Year 2000 — Jeff Betts
Defender Of The Year 2000 — Rob Baarts

References

Defunct indoor soccer clubs in the United States
Soccer clubs in Salt Lake City
World Indoor Soccer League teams
1999 establishments in Utah
2001 disestablishments in Utah
Association football clubs established in 1999
Association football clubs disestablished in 2001
Soccer clubs in Utah